The Compact Modular Architecture (CMA) is a global mid-size unibody automobile platform, jointly developed by Volvo and Geely under their China Euro Vehicle Technology AB (CEVT) R&D banner.

Development began in 2013 with the goal of producing a highly flexible vehicle platform. Only the distance between the centre of the front wheels and the pedal box is fixed, everything else can be configured to suit the intended vehicle design.

The platform debuted in September 2017 with the release of the Volvo XC40. The CMA platform configuration in the XC40 will feature new 1.5-litre, three-cylinder engines with turbocharged and naturally aspirated variations. The platform will also accommodate a plug-in hybrid configuration capable of 180 bhp, supplemented by a 74 bhp electric motor.

Applications 
The Compact Modular Architecture platform is also shared with Chinese startup company, Lynk & Co. The Lynk & Co 01 SUV will be the first of several Lynk & Co models to be underpinned by the CMA platform.

Volvo released its first fully electric car Polestar 2 based on the CMA platform in 2019.

Vehicles using platform (calendar years):

 Geely Xingyue/Tugella (FY11) (2019–present)
 Geely Xingrui (FS11) (2020–present)
 Geely Xingyue L/Monjaro (KX11) (2021–present)
 Lynk & Co 01 (CX11) (2017–present)
 Lynk & Co 02 (CC11) (2018–present) 
 Lynk & Co 03 (CS11) (2018–present)
 Lynk & Co 05 (2019–present)
 Polestar 2 (2020–present)
 Volvo XC40 (V316) (2017–present)
 Volvo C40 (2022–present)

See also 

 B-segment Modular Architecture platform
Volvo Scalable Product Architecture platform
 Sustainable Experience Architecture platform

References

External links 

 Official press release

Volvo Cars platforms
Geely Holding platforms